The  is a professional wrestling light heavyweight championship owned by the Osaka Pro Wrestling (OPW) promotion. Only wrestlers under the light heavyweight weight-limit may hold the championship.

The inaugural and current champion is Tigers Mask.

History
The title was announced in March 2022 and the belt, unveiled on April 30, was awarded to Tigers Mask after he won an eight-man tournament on July 31.

Inaugural tournament

Reigns

See also
Professional wrestling in Japan

References

Osaka Pro Wrestling championships
Light heavyweight wrestling championships